Marshland is a semi-rural suburb on the northern side of Christchurch city. The land is primarily used for horticulture and dairy farming.

The suburb is named for the peaty soil, and was also called Rhodes' Swamp after landowner and politician Robert Heaton Rhodes (1815–1884).

 forms the western and southern boundary of the suburb. The Styx River runs northeast through Marshland.

Demographics

Marshland had a population of 789 at the 2018 New Zealand census, an increase of 30 people (4.0%) since the 2013 census, and an increase of 6 people (0.8%) since the 2006 census. There were 258 households. There were 408 males and 381 females, giving a sex ratio of 1.07 males per female. The median age was 41.1 years (compared with 37.4 years nationally), with 135 people (17.1%) aged under 15 years, 162 (20.5%) aged 15 to 29, 387 (49.0%) aged 30 to 64, and 105 (13.3%) aged 65 or older.

Ethnicities were 87.5% European/Pākehā, 12.5% Māori, 1.5% Pacific peoples, 7.6% Asian, and 1.1% other ethnicities (totals add to more than 100% since people could identify with multiple ethnicities).

The proportion of people born overseas was 16.3%, compared with 27.1% nationally.

Although some people objected to giving their religion, 50.6% had no religion, 40.3% were Christian, 0.4% were Muslim, 0.8% were Buddhist and 1.5% had other religions.

Of those at least 15 years old, 111 (17.0%) people had a bachelor or higher degree, and 120 (18.3%) people had no formal qualifications. The median income was $37,700, compared with $31,800 nationally. The employment status of those at least 15 was that 330 (50.5%) people were employed full-time, 96 (14.7%) were part-time, and 18 (2.8%) were unemployed.

Education
Marshland School is a full primary school catering for years 1 to 8.

References

Suburbs of Christchurch
Populated places in Canterbury, New Zealand